Kwun Tong Kung Lok Government Secondary School (often abbreviated as KTKLGSS) is a secondary school located at 90 Kung Lok Road, Kwun Tong, Kowloon, Hong Kong. It is a boys' school founded in 1970.

History
In 1970, the Education Department founded Kwun Tong Government Secondary Technical School. Because the changes in  Hong Kong's education policy, the school name was transferred from Traditional Technical schools to the same as Traditional Grammar schools, Kwun Tong Kung Lok Government Secondary School (Kung Lok refers to Kung Lok Road).

In 1990, the school began setting up the student union.

In 1993, Kwun Tong Government Secondary Technical School Alumni Association was set up.

In September 1999, the alumni association’s name changed to Kwun Tong Kung Lok Government Secondary School Alumni Association.

The school's basketball team makes an outstanding performance, from D1 level promoted to D3 level in short four years.

The school implements The Hong Kong Award for Young People.

In 2000, the alumni association designed the poster for the new wing and donated a banyan to commemorate the 30th anniversary.

In mid-April 2010, the school made headlines across Hong Kong newspapers due to bullying problems and alleged inaction by teachers.

Purpose
Kwun Tong Kung Lok Government Secondary School aims to provide holistic education to students, instruct them to get a balanced development. The school also provides maturity learning facilities, assist the students to learn a comprehensive education, help them create a positive outlook on life and encourage them to think globally and serve the community.

School song
Many thoughts our minds employ, every day throughout our lives,

Hopes of health and ease and joy, 'tis for these we often strive,

These two truths at school we learn, the truth of what is just and fine,

Next to know ourselves in turn, and seek improvement all the time.

Subjects offered
S.1 – S.3:

Chinese, English, Mathematics*, Integrated Science* (S1-S2), Geography*, Chinese History, Computer Literacy*, Music*, Physical Education*, Visual Arts*, Putonghua, Life and Society*, Liberal Studies* (S3), Business & Economics Foundation (S3), Design & Technology

S.4 – S.6:

Chinese, English, Mathematics, Liberal Studies, Combined Science (Chem, Bio)(S5-S6), Physics, Chemistry, Biology, Economics, Geography, Chinese History, Information & Communication Technology, Design & Applied Technology, 'Business, Accounting and Financial Studies', Visual Arts, Tourism & Hospitality, Film & Video Studies, Music, Physical Education, Applied Learning (Mode 1), English extended learning activities.

Notable alumni
 Tsui Po-ko, a Hong Kong police office who was implicated in a number of crimes.
 Ian Hung Kin Wah, a Hong Kong singer.

See also
 Education in Hong Kong
 List of secondary schools in Hong Kong

References

External links
 

Educational institutions established in 1970
Government schools in Hong Kong
Kwun Tong
Secondary schools in Hong Kong